The Jazz Singers: A Smithsonian Collection of Jazz Vocals from 1919-1994 is a box set containing five CDs released by the Smithsonian Institution in 1998. It is organized thematically, rather than chronologically. Half of the categories overlap from one disc to another.

Track listing
(Disc 1)

Steeped In The Blues
1-01 	Eva Taylor - "West End Blues" (3:09)
1-02 	Bessie Smith - "In the House Blues" (2:59)
1-03 	Louis Armstrong - "2:19 Blues" (2:52)
1-04 	Jimmy Rushing - "I Left My Baby" (3:10)
1-05 	Billie Holiday - "'Tain't Nobody's Business If I Do" (3:19)
1-06 	Helen Humes - "Blues With Helen" (4:08)
1-07 	Hot Lips Page - "I Won't Be Here Long" (2:40)
1-08 	Billy Eckstine - "Jelly, Jelly" (3:28)
1-09 	Julia Lee - "Lotus Blossom" (3:17)
1-10 	Jimmy Witherspoon - "Goin' To Kansas City" (3:11)
1-11 	Joe Williams / Lambert, Hendricks & Ross - "Goin' To Chicago" (4:09)
1-12 	Ernie Andrews - "She's Got To Go" (4:01)
1-13 	Ernestine Anderson  - "Never Make Your Move Too Soon" (3:27)
1-14 	Lorez Alexandria - "D.B. Blues" (2:56)
1-15 	Cassandra Wilson - "Come On in My Kitchen" (4:53)

Straight Out Of Church
1-16 	Blind Willie Johnson - "Nobody's Fault but Mine" (3:09)
1-17 	Angelic Gospel Singers / Dixie Hummingbirds, The - "One Day" (2:14)
1-18 	Mahalia Jackson - "I'm Going To Live The Life I Sing About In My Song" (2:36)

Rhythm Singers: Let's Have A Party
1-19 	Bessie Smith - "Gimme a Pigfoot (And a Bottle of Beer)" (3:28)
1-20 	Jelly Roll Morton - "Doctor Jazz" (3:20)
1-21 	Don Redman - "Shakin' The African" (2:38)
1-22 	Ivie Anderson - "It Don't Mean a Thing (If It Ain't Got That Swing)" (3:09)
(Disc 2)
2-01 	Cab Calloway - "The Man From Harlem" (3:06)
2-02 	Anita O'Day - "Let Me Off Uptown" (3:02)
2-03 	Pearl Bailey and Moms Mabley - "Saturday Night Fish Fry" (2:52)
2-04 	Louis Jordan - "Hogwash" (2:57)
2-05 	Wynonie Harris - "Good Rockin' Tonight" (2:46)

Swinging The Songbook
2-06 	Louis Armstrong - "All Of Me" (2:55)
2-07 	Louis Armstrong - "Top Hat, White Tie and Tails" (4:08)
2-08 	Ethel Waters - "I Can't Give You Anything But Love" (3:07)
2-09 	Billie Holiday - "I Can't Give You Anything But Love" (3:26)
2-10 	Billie Holiday - "These Foolish Things" (3:16)
2-11 	Billie Holiday - "Me, Myself, and I" (2:35)
2-12 	Mildred Bailey - "Lover, Come Back to Me" (3:09)
2-13 	Al Hibbler - "Don't Get Around Much Anymore" (3:01)
2-14 	Joe Turner - "You're Driving Me Crazy" (4:12)
2-15 	Ella Fitzgerald and Louis Armstrong - "Don't Be That Way" (4:59)
2-16 	Frank Sinatra - "Night and Day" (3:57)
2-17 	Jimmy Rushing - "Some of These Days" (4:47)
2-18 	Sarah Vaughan - "Wrap Your Troubles In Dreams" (2:30)
2-19 	Dinah Washington - "I Get A Kick Out Of You" (6:17)
2-20 	Joe Williams - "There's a Small Hotel" (2:15)
2-21 	Nat King Cole - "Just You, Just Me" (3:00)
(Disc 3)
3-01 	Dakota Staton - "Give Me the Simple Life" (2:13)
3-02 	Nina Simone - "Love Me Or Leave Me" (4:04)
3-03 	Aretha Franklin - "You Are My Sunshine" (4:18)
3-04 	Marvin Gaye - "What's Going On" (3:47)
3-05 	Etta Jones - "I'm Gonna Lock My Heart (And Throw Away The Key)" (3:10)

After Hours: Slow-Dancing And Torching The Songbook
3-06 	Billie Holiday - "Yesterdays" (3:23)
3-07 	Billie Holiday - "Strange Fruit" (3:06)
3-08 	Billie Holiday - "You've Changed" (3:16)
3-09 	Ella Fitzgerald - "Someone To Watch Over Me" (3:14)
3-10 	Ella Fitzgerald - "Until The Real Thing Comes Along" (2:55)
3-11 	Fats Waller & His Rhythm - "Until the Real Thing Comes Along" (3:23)
3-12 	Dinah Washington - "You Don't Know What Love Is" (4:00)
3-13 	June Christy - "For All We Know" (2:46)
3-14 	Chris Connor - "Angel Eyes" (3:41)
3-15 	Billy Eckstine - "In the Still of the Night" (3:40)
3-16 	Nancy Wilson - "Save Your Love For Me" (2:42)
3-17 	Shirley Horn - "Travelin' Light" (2:46)
3-18 	Sarah Vaughan - "Prelude to a Kiss" (2:45)
3-19 	Gloria Lynne - "My Little Brown Book" (2:30)
3-20 	Johnny Hartman - "Lush Life" (5:27)
3-21 	Carmen McRae - "I Got It Bad (And That Ain't Good)" (3:26)
(Disc 4)
4-01 	Betty Carter - "This Is Always" (3:10)
4-02 	Little Jimmy Scott - "All Of Me" (2:57)
4-03 	Earl Coleman - "What Are You Doing the Rest of Your Life?" (5:47)
4-04 	Helen Merrill - "You're My Thrill" (3:16)
4-05 	Al Green - "Could I Be The One?" (4:05)

Jazz Compositions
4-06 	Lucille Hegamin - "Jazz Me Blues" (2:33)
4-07 	Baby Cox - "The Mooche" (3:11)
4-08 	King Pleasure - "Parker's Mood" (2:58)
4-09 	Sarah Vaughan - "Lullaby Of Birdland" (3:59)
4-10 	Mel Tormé - "Down For Double" (2:31)
4-11 	Lambert, Hendricks & Ross – "Jumpin' at the Woodside" (3:17)
4-12 	Abbey Lincoln - "Left Alone" (6:45)
4-13 	Mark Murphy - "Stolen Moments" (5:43)
4-14 	Jeanne Lee - "Worry Now Later" (1:25)
4-15 	Carmen McRae - "Get It Straight" (3:54)
4-16 	Bobby McFerrin - "'Round Midnight" (5:33)
4-17 	Dee Dee Bridgewater - "Doodlin'" (6:04)

Scat And Vocalese
4-18 	Jelly Roll Morton - "Improvised Scat Song" (1:45)
4-19 	Louis Armstrong & His Hot Five - "Hotter Than That" (2:59)
(Disc 5)
5-01 	Louis Armstrong and His Orchestra - "Sweet Sue (Just You)" (2:44)
5-02 	Bing Crosby / The Mills Brothers - "My Honey's Lovin' Arms" (2:56)
5-03 	Dizzy Gillespie - "Ool Ya Koo" (6:00)
5-04 	Eddie Jefferson - "Disappointed (Excerpt)" (2:48)
5-05 	Ella Fitzgerald - "Them There Eyes" (5:05)
5-06 	Anita O'Day - "The Way You Look Tonight" (2:10)
5-07 	George Benson - "The Masquerade (Excerpt)" (3:17)
5-08 	Betty Carter - "Frenesi" (2:30)

Novelties And Take-Offs
5-09 	Noble Sissle - "Jazzola" (2:51)
5-10 	Louis Armstrong - "Hobo, You Can't Ride This Train" (3:03)
5-11 	Louis Armstrong - "Rockin' Chair" (5:15)
5-12 	Trummy Young - "'Tain't What You Do" (3:02)
5-13 	George "Bon Bon" Tunnell - "Vol Vist Du Gaily Star" (3:03)
5-14 	Leo Watson and The Spirits Of Rhythm - "We've Got The Blues" (3:18)
5-15 	Ella Fitzgerald - "Cow-Cow Boogie" (2:52)
5-16 	Slim Gaillard and His Orchestra - "Babalu (Orooney)" (3:30)
5-17 	Nellie Lutcher and Her Rhythm - "Chi-Chi-Chi-Chicago" (2:58)
5-18 	Ben Webster - "Did You Call Her Today? (Excerpt)" (6:25)
5-19 	Lester Young - "Takes Two to Tango" (3:26)
5-20 	Clark Terry - "Mumbles" (2:00)
5-21 	Slam Stewart and Major Holley - "Close Your Eyes (Shut Yo' Mouth)" (3:31)

See also
Vocal jazz

External links
"Various - The Jazz Singers" - Discogs.com album information.

1998 compilation albums
Jazz compilation albums